Nixe is a genus of mayflies in the family Heptageniidae.

Species
Nixe dorothae
Nixe flowersi
Nixe horrida
Nixe inconspicua
Nixe kennedyi
Nixe lucidipennis
Nixe perfida
Nixe rusticalis
Nixe spinosa

References

Mayfly genera